Oymurania is an organophosphatic Cambrian small shelly fossil interpreted as a stem-group Brachiopod.  It consists of a pair of Micrina-like shells that broadly follow a logarithmic coiling trajectory with a high rate of expansion.

Microstructure
Its shell comprises an inner prismatic layer, with hexagonal prisms that run through the full depth of the layer, and an outer layer that contains an acrotretid-like microstructure of surface-parallel laminae punctuated by pore-bearing rod-like columns.

References

Prehistoric brachiopod genera

Cambrian genus extinctions